The Media24 Books Literary Awards (known before 2011 as the Via Afrika Awards, and before that as the Nasboek Literary Awards) are a group of five South African literary prizes awarded annually by Media24, the print-media arm of the South African media company Naspers. They are open to authors whose books are published within the Media24 Books stable (previously known as the Via Afrika stable), which includes NB Publishers, Jonathan Ball Publishers, LuxVerbi-BM, NVA, and Van Schaik Publishers. Each award is worth R35 000. The awards comprise:
 The W.A. Hofmeyr Prize, a long-established prize for Afrikaans literature;
 The Herman Charles Bosman Prize for English literature;
 The Recht Malan Prize for non-fiction;
 The MER Prizes for illustrated children’s books and youth literature; 
 The Elisabeth Eybers Prize for poetry.
The Jan Rabie Rapport Prize, for debut works in Afrikaans, was awarded annually at the same awards ceremony as the Media24 prizes from 2004 to 2014, but was open to all South African publishers. The M-Net Literary Awards were also awarded at the same ceremony until 2010.

The 2020 awards were heavily criticised for their lack of diversity. The winners included six white males and one white female, while the 18 judges included of only two people of colour.

W.A. Hofmeyr Prize 
The W.A. Hofmeyr Prize is awarded annually for literary excellence in drama, poetry and prose that could "shift the boundaries of Afrikaans literature." It was instituted in 1954 by Nasionale Pers in honour of Afrikaans businessman W.A. Hofmeyr, a former chairman of the company. Originally only books published by Nasionale Boekhandel (NB Publishers) were eligible, but it is now open to all presses within the Media24 stable. As of 2020, the award was worth R35 000.

Herman Charles Bosman Prize 
The Herman Charles Bosman Prize, named for South African short-story writer Herman Charles Bosman, recognises excellence in English literary writing, including autobiography, in South Africa.

Recht Malan Prize 
The Recht Malan Prize recognises excellent non-fiction or non-literary books in English or Afrikaans, aiming to promote quality of writing, depth of research, and originality of approach. It was first awarded in 1978.

Elisabeth Eybers Prize 
The Elisabeth Eybers Prize, named for Afrikaans poet Elisabeth Eybers, recognises poetry in English and Afrikaans. It aims to reward "excellence and innovation" in poetry, and was awarded for the first time in 2014.

MER Prizes 
The MER Prizes, named after Afrikaans children's author Mimie E. Rothmann, are longstanding awards which recognise illustrated children's books and youth literature, aimed at (but not exclusively for) ages 0–8 and 8–16 respectively. The prize in the children's category is split between the author and the illustrator.

Jan Rabie Rapport Prize 
The Jan Rabie Rapport Prize, named for Afrikaans writer Jan Rabie, is awarded to debut or early works "characterised by fresh and innovative Afrikaans prose." It was given for the first time in 2004, and until 2014 was awarded with the Media24 Books awards, although it was open to books from all publishers. Since 2015, it has been awarded with the kykNET-Rapport Book Prizes, a group of Afrikaans literary awards.

References

External links
Herman Charles Bosman Prize, African Book Awards Database, Indian University
W.A. Hofmeyr Prize, African Book Awards Database
Recht Malan Prize, African Book Awards Database
Jan Rabie Rapport Prize, African Book Awards Database

South African literary awards
Fiction awards
South African literary events